John Brooks is a Premier League football referee, who was promoted in June 2021.  Prior to this, Brooks had been a Select Group 2 referee since 2018, and prior to this, he had been a Premier League assistant referee.

In December 2021, Brooks refereed his first Premier League match between Wolves and Burnley at Molineux.

On 11 February 2023, Brooks wrongly ruled out a goal by Brighton & Hove Albion's Pervis Estupiñán against Crystal Palace. A technician tasked with drawing the lines failed to draw the line to the deepest Crystal Palace defender and mistakenly identified James Tomkins as the Crystal Palace player closest to his own goal when it was actually his team-mate Marc Guehi. After the image was presented to Brooks, he misjudged the situation and unintentionally ruled out Brighton & Hove's goal. An emergency meeting was convened by PGMOL head Howard Webb after the incident. Following the meeting, John Brooks was subsequently dropped for matches for his next two matches: Monday’s Merseyside derby between Liverpool and Everton and Manchester City versus Arsenal.

References

External links 
 

1990 births
English football referees
Premier League referees
Sportspeople from Melton Mowbray
Living people